(Thomas) Roderic West is an Irish Anglican priest: he is the current Archdeacon of Dromore.

Roderic was born in 1955, educated at Trinity College, Dublin and ordained in 1987. He first post was a curacy at Dromore Cathedral. After this he was the incumbent at Carrowdore then Moira. He has been Archdeacon of Dromore since 2011.

References

1955 births
Living people
Archdeacons of Dromore
Alumni of Trinity College Dublin